10 DOL is a gram panchayat in the Gharsana tehsil of the Ganganagar district of Rajasthan, India. It is located in south west of Gharsana tehsil.

References

10 DOL